Eugen Emil Plazzeriano (3 December 1897 – 6 November 1972) was a Croatian footballer. He competed in the men's tournament at the 1924 Summer Olympics. Born in Zagreb, he spent his entire career between 1919 until 1928 playing as forward with HAŠK.

International career
He made his debut and played his sole international match for Yugoslavia in a May 1924 Olympic Games match against Uruguay.

References

External links
 

1897 births
1972 deaths
Footballers from Zagreb
People from the Kingdom of Croatia-Slavonia
Association football forwards
Yugoslav footballers
Yugoslavia international footballers
Olympic footballers of Yugoslavia
Footballers at the 1924 Summer Olympics
HAŠK players